The High Commissioner of Australia to Nauru is an officer of the Australian Department of Foreign Affairs and Trade and the head of the High Commission of the Commonwealth of Australia in Nauru. The position has the rank and status of an Ambassador Extraordinary and Plenipotentiary and is currently by Helen Cheney since September 2021. Australia is one of only two countries to have a resident diplomatic mission in Nauru, the other being the embassy of Taiwan.

Posting history

With the end of the Australian trusteeship administration and the formal independence of Nauru on 31 January 1968, the Australian Government appointed a Representative to the small island nation. With the establishment of a resident Australian High Commission on Nauru's admission to the Commonwealth of Nations from 1972, the position also had responsibility as the Commissioner for the Gilbert and Ellice Islands (1972–1976) and the Gilbert Islands (1976–1979), and then as the non-resident accredited High Commissioner to Kiribati from 1979. In 1981, The Australian Government announced that it would open a resident High Commission in Kiribati, which was achieved in August 1982. 

In January 1975, Alan Fogg was appointed Commissioner in Nauru, and also as non-resident Commissioner to the Solomon Islands. With the independence of the Solomon Islands in 1978, resident Australian High Commission was established on 7 July 1978. In December 1981, career diplomat Rodney Hodgson was announced as the next high commissioner to Nauru. However a few weeks later he was killed in a car accident, before he could take up his appointment.

When the new Commonwealth government of Prime Minister John Howard cut the budget of the Department of Foreign Affairs and Trade in 1996–97, forcing the closure of the High Commission in Nauru, in July 1997, accreditation for Nauru was transferred to the high commission in Suva, Fiji. From 1997 to 2009, the position of high commissioner was held by the High Commissioner resident in Fiji. A Consulate-General in Nauru was opened 2002, which was subsequently upgraded to a High Commission on 4 August 2009.

Heads of mission

Notes
 Also non-resident Commissioner to the Gilbert and Ellice Islands (1972–1976), Commissioner to the Gilbert Islands (1976–1979), and as High Commissioner to Kiribati (1979–1982).
 Also non-resident Commissioner to the Solomon Islands, 1975–1978.
 Prior to appointment as High Commissioner, served as resident Special Representative and Consul-General from 11 October 2005 until 2 August 2009.

References

External links

Australian High Commission, Republic of Nauru

 
Nauru
Australia
Australia and the Commonwealth of Nations
Nauru and the Commonwealth of Nations